Keran may refer to:

 Keran, Neelum Valley a town in Azad Kashmir, Pakistan
 Keran, Jammu and Kashmir, a village Jammu and Kashmir, India
 Keran, Queen of Armenia, 13th-century Armenian queen
 Kéran Prefecture, a prefecture of Togo
 Kéran National Park a protected area in Togo
 Keran, Iran (disambiguation)